Megalonaias is a genus of bivalves belonging to the family Unionidae.

The species of this genus are found in Central Asia and Northern America.

Species
Species:

Megalonaias nervosa 
Megalonaias nickliniana

References

Unionidae
Bivalve genera